Madawaska Lake (Freymond) Water Aerodrome  is located  southwest of Whitney , Ontario, Canada.

References

Registered aerodromes in Ontario
Seaplane bases in Ontario